Marco Pecota is the co-publisher of Rue Morgue and owner of Veni Vidi Vici Motion Pictures. He was a Genie Award nominee at the 29th Genie Awards as a producer of the short film The Facts in the Case of Mister Hollow.

External links
Rue Morgue Magazine
Veni Vidi Vici Motion Pictures

Year of birth missing (living people)
Living people
Place of birth missing (living people)
Canadian magazine publishers (people)
Canadian film producers
21st-century Canadian people